Pauline Bianca Cruz Esquieres (born October 5, 1999), known professionally as Pauline Mendoza, is a Filipino actress. She is also known for her various roles in Little Nanay (2015), That's My Amboy (2016), My Love from the Star (2017), and Kambal, Karibal (2017-2018) as Crisel, her biggest break to date. She was seen in Babawiin Ko ang Lahat (2021) as her first leading role in television.

Career

2014–2016: Career beginnings and breakthrough
She began her career in 2015 where she appeared as 'Macy in Little Nanay. She has then appeared in That's My Amboy and Juan Happy Love Story in 2016, and Alyas Robin Hood.

2017– present: Breakthrough
In 2017, she got her role as Marcela in My Love from the Star. After that, she had been appearing as guest casts and given minor roles. She got her biggest break in the hit primetime series Kambal, Karibal, where in she was cast as Criselda "Crisel" Magpantay, the bitter-sweet twin sister of Crisanta "Crisan" Magpantay, portrayed by her co-star Bianca Umali in the titular roles. She had received various positive recognitions because of her portrayal of the character along with then newly signed Kapuso artist Kyline Alcantara, who was also part of the main cast in the series. Since then, she has appeared in various anthologies such as Magpakailanman and Dear Uge, and on the prime time series Cain at Abel as Patricia "Pat" Tolentino and Love You Two (2019) as Zora Babawiin Ko Ang Lahat (2021) as Iris Allegre-Salvador and Widow's Web (2022) as Elaine Innocencio-Querubin.

Personal life
Her real full name is Pauline Bianca Cruz Esquieres. In 2021, it was revealed that she is in a relationship with Alaminos mayor Bryan Celeste. She is currently taking up Bachelor of Science Major in Interior Design at De La Salle–College of Saint Benilde.

Filmography

Awards and nominations

Notes

References

External links
 

1999 births
Living people
Filipino child actresses
Filipino television actresses
Filipino female models
GMA Network personalities
Actresses from Quezon
People from Quezon
Filipino people of Spanish descent
Filipino people of American descent